Harper's Grove – Lord's Grove is a Site of Special Scientific Interest (SSSI), noted for its biological characteristics, in Monmouthshire, south east Wales.

Geography

Gallery

References

Nature reserves in Monmouthshire
Sites of Special Scientific Interest in Monmouthshire
Sites of Special Scientific Interest notified in 1981